The Joe Hernandez Stakes is a Grade II American Thoroughbred horse race for horses aged four years old or older over the distance of  furlongs on the turf scheduled annually in January at Santa Anita Park in Arcadia, California.  The event currently carries a purse of $250,000.

History 
The race was inaugurated in 2008 in honor of Joe Hernandez (June 3, 1909February 2, 1972) the race caller at Santa Anita Park from the time the track opened on Christmas Day 1934 until he fainted at the microphone on 27 January, 1972.

The event was predominantly raced on the downhill turf course over the about  furlongs distance. In 2010 the event was moved to the synthetic All Weather track due to weather. The 2015 running was also moved off the turf but by then Santa Anita Park had restored the natural dirt track.

In 2019 the event was upgraded to Grade III and a year later to Grade II.

In 2020 the event was moved and run using the backstretch start at a distance of  furlongs on turf, and the following year the event was run on the newly extended backstretch and close to the former distance of  furlongs.

The 2017 winner Stormy Liberal followed up winning the Breeders' Cup Turf Sprint and repeating that effort in 2018.

The event was run twice in the calendar year in 2022 due to scheduling changes.

Records
Speed record: 
 about  furlongs – 1:11.17  –  Unbridled's Note  (2013)

Margins: 
  lengths – Distinctiv Passion  (2015) 
 
Most wins by a jockey  
 3 – Joel Rosario   (2009, 2012, 2021)
 3 – Joseph Talamo   (2014, 2018, 2019)

Most wins by a trainer
 3 – Peter L. Miller   (2017, 2020, 2021)

Winners 

Legend:

References 

Graded stakes races in the United States
Grade 2 stakes races in the United States
2008 establishments in California
Open sprint category horse races
Horse races in California
Turf races in the United States
Recurring sporting events established in 2008 
Santa Anita Park